Remaindered books or remainders are printed books that are no longer selling well, and whose remaining unsold copies are liquidated by the publisher at greatly reduced prices. While the publisher may take a net loss on the sales of these books, they are able to recover at least some of their sunken costs on the sale and clear out space in the warehouses.

Copies of remaindered books may be marked by the publisher, distributor, or bookseller to prevent them from being returned.  "Remainder marks" have varied over the years, but today most remainders are marked with a stroke with a felt-tipped marker across the top or bottom of the book's pages, near the spine.

Only hardcovers and trade paperbacks (paperback books, often larger than "pocket" paperbacks, sold "to the trade" or directly to sales outlets) are typically remaindered. Mass market paperbacks ("pocket" paperback books sold through a third-party distributor) usually become stripped books rather than remaindered books. A book that might retail for $20 to $30 will typically be purchased by someone specializing in remainders for $1 and resold for approximately $5 to $15.

In the United States
Since Thor Power Tool Company v. Commissioner of Internal Revenue, books in the United States have been remaindered much earlier and in greater quantities than prior to the 1979 decision. Since then, the number of unsold books that have simply been destroyed (by being trashed, burned, or recycled) instead of being sold at a large reduction has also risen greatly.

See also
 Cut-out (recording industry)
 Misprint

References

External links
 Remainder Marks  (from the International On-Line Booksellers Association)
 Clive James (2 June 1983). "The book of my enemy has been remaindered". London Review of Books.

Book terminology
Books by type